Robert Vidal may refer to:

 Walpole Vidal (1853–1914), footballer
 Robert Vidal (cyclist) (born 1933), French cyclist
 Robert Studley Vidal (1770–1841), English barrister, translator, legal writer and antiquary